Working Men is a live compilation album by Canadian progressive rock band Rush. The compilation documents a shortlist of career-spanning material pulled from the band's three tours during the 2000s. It is available in both CD and DVD formats like the previous releases. Both formats were released on November 13, 2009, in Europe and November 17, 2009, in the United States and Canada.

Track listing

Notes
 Track 1, 10 & 12 are originally from Moving Pictures 
 Track 2 & 4 are originally from Permanent Waves 
 Track 3 is originally from 2112 
 Track 5 is originally from Roll the Bones 
 Track 6 is originally from Snakes & Arrows 
 Track 7 is originally from Signals 
 Track 8 is originally from Vapor Trails 
 Track 9 is originally from A Farewell to Kings 
 Track 11 is originally from Rush

References

2009 live albums
2009 compilation albums
2009 video albums
Atlantic Records live albums
Rush (band) compilation albums
Rush (band) video albums
Rush (band) live albums
Atlantic Records compilation albums
Atlantic Records video albums